Doldykan is a rural locality (a selo) in Doldykansky Selsoviet of Bureysky District, Amur Oblast, Russia. The population was 369 as of 2018. There are 7 streets.

Geography 
Doldykan is located on the R297 highway, 15 km north of Novobureysky (the district's administrative centre) by road. Novobureysky is the nearest rural locality.

References 

Rural localities in Bureysky District